Apocordulia is a genus of dragonflies in the family Austrocorduliidae,
endemic to the Murray-Darling Basin in eastern Australia.

Apocordulia is a monotypic genus with only one species, Apocordulia macrops,
commonly known as a nighthawk.
Apocordulia macrops is a medium-sized, dull coloured dragonfly with large eyes. It inhabits inland rivers 
and flies at dawn and dusk.

Etymology
The word Apocordulia is derived from two words: apo from the Greek ἀπό meaning from or away, and Cordulia the genus of dragonfly. Tony Watson described the dragonfly genus Apocordulia as appearing different to the normal appearance of a Cordulia dragonfly.

The species name macrops is derived from two Greek words makros (μακρός) meaning long, and ops (ὤψ) meaning eye, describing the long eye seam.

Gallery

Note about family
There are differing views as to the family that Apocordulia best belongs to:
 It is considered to be part of the family Austrocorduliidae at the Australian Faunal Directory
 It is considered to be part of the family Synthemistidae in the World Odonata List at the Slater Museum of Natural History
 It is considered to be part of the family Corduliidae at Wikispecies

See also
 List of Odonata species of Australia

References

Austrocorduliidae
Anisoptera genera
Monotypic Odonata genera
Odonata of Australia
Taxa named by J.A.L. (Tony) Watson
Insects described in 1980